Backhousia leptopetala (syn. Choricarpia leptopetala) is a common Australian tree, growing from Stanwell Park (34° S) in the northern Illawarra district to near Buderim (26° S) in south eastern Queensland.

Common names include brown myrtle, never-break, brush turpentine and rusty turpentine.  The habitat of Backhousia leptopetala is rainforest on the poorer sedimentary soils, near streams. It is also seen in moist eucalyptus areas on ridges. It may be identified by the greyish fawn colour under the leaf, and rusty hairy branchlets.

Description 
Backhousia leptopetala is a small tree, occasionally reaching 20 metres in height and a 35 cm in trunk diameter. The tree has attractive displays of cream flowers and appealing foliage.

The bark is a greyish brown, relatively soft, flaky or corky.  The trunk is somewhat fluted and irregular. Larger trees are flanged at the base.

The leaves are opposite, simple and entire. Broad with a fine leaf tip. Around 5 to 13 cm long. The edges of the leaves are curled over and wavy. A mid green above, but a greyish fawny green underneath. The midrib is sunken on the top surface, but venation is prominent under the leaf. Near the wavy leaf edge, is an intramarginal vein, not always easily seen. The underside of the leaf is covered in tiny hairs.

Flowers are small. Cream or white, densely together in globular heads, appearing in July to September. From a distance, flowers resemble the Callicoma.

The fruit matures from August to November, being mostly a two celled capsule, around 13 mm in diameter. Fresh seed is recommended for germination. Cuttings are not a successful method of regeneration.

Uses
An attractive ornamental tree.

References
Citations

Bibliography
  (other publication details, included in citation)
 Choricarpia leptopetala at NSW Flora Online Retrieved 22 July 2009 

Myrtales of Australia
Trees of Australia
Flora of New South Wales
Flora of Queensland
Ornamental trees
leptopetala
Taxa named by Ferdinand von Mueller